Johan Jakob Jakobsen (15 April 1937 – 30 June 2018) was a Norwegian politician, member of the Norwegian Centre Party.

He had a long political career, sitting seven terms as a representative in the Norwegian Parliament, first elected in 1973. This run was not entirely successive, however, as he was a member of two different cabinets in the 1980s. On 8 June 1983 (in the middle of a term), he was assigned to the Kåre Willoch's centre-right coalition government, with Jakobsen leading the Ministry of Transport and Communications. This government lasted until 1986. After the 1989 elections, the coalition was once again able to form a government; this time led by Prime Minister Jan P. Syse. Jakobsen was Minister of Local Government. The rest of his political career, from which he stepped down in 2001, he was a member of parliament.

In addition, he was chairman of the Centre Party from 1979 to 1991. Together with Per Borten, he is the longest-serving party leader. He was also a noted opponent of Norway joining the European Union.

Jakobsen has written one book, titled Mot Strømmen (Against the Grain in English).

References

1937 births
2018 deaths
Centre Party (Norway) politicians
Members of the Storting
Ministers of Transport and Communications of Norway
Ministers of Local Government and Modernisation of Norway
21st-century Norwegian politicians
20th-century Norwegian politicians
People from Namsos